Events from the year 1816 in Denmark.

Incumbents
 Monarch – Frederick VI
 Prime minister – Joachim Godske Moltke

Events

Undated
 Kommercekollegiet is merged with Generaltoldkammeret (General Chamber of Customs and Excise).

Births
 21 January – Louise Phister, actress (died 1914)
 16 February – Julie Reventlow, countess, writer and salonist (born 1763)
 7 March – Catharine Simonsen, soprano (died 1849)
 29 March – Christen Mikkelsen Kold, teacher who founded a school in Ryslinge that later became a model for the Danish folk high-school system (died 1870)
 17 April – Jens Adolf Jerichau, sculptor (died 1883)
 13 June – Dankvart Dreyer, painter (died 1852)
 21 June – Anders Sandøe Ørsted, botanist, mycologist, zoologist and marine biologist (died 1872)
 7 August – Carit Etlar, author (died 1900)
 8 December – Edvard Helsted, composer (died 1900)

Undated
 Rudolph Striegler, photographer (died 1876)

Deaths
 22 August – Hartvig Marcus Frisch, civil servant (born 1754)
 2 December – Charlotte Schimmelmann, Norwegian-born salonist and patron (born 1757)

References

 
1810s in Denmark
Denmark
Years of the 19th century in Denmark